This is a list of museums in Saint Petersburg, Russia.

Biographical museums

Writers

Anna Akhmatova museums 
Anna Akhmatova Literary and Memorial Museum (Fountain House)
Anna Akhmatova. The Silver Age (in Avtovo)

Alexander Pushkin museums 
National Pushkin Museum - of Alexander Pushkin, with branches:
Derzhavin Museum - of Gavrila Derzhavin
Nekrasov Apartment Museum - of Nikolay Nekrasov, with Ivan Panaev memorial study
The Tsarskoye Selo Lyceum Museum

Other writers 
Derzhavin Museum - of Gavrila Derzhavin
Dostoevsky Museum
Joseph Brodsky - two locations: branch of Anna Akhmatova (Fountain House) Museum and Brodsky's apartment in St. Petersburg 
Mikhail Zoshchenko's apartment
Nabokov House

Literary characters 
Ostap Bender

Artists 
Arkhip Kuindzhi - a branch of Russian Academy of Arts Research Museum
Ilya Repin (The Penates House)  - a branch of Russian Academy of Arts Research Museum
Isaak Brodsky - a branch of Russian Academy of Arts Research Museum

Scientists/scholars 
Dmitry Mendeleev's Memorial Museum Apartment
Ivan Pavlov's memorial apartment - in Academician's Home (Rus. Dom Akademikov) at 1, Lieutenant Schmidt Embankment
Lev Gumilev - branch of Anna Akhmatova (Fountain House) Museum
Mikhail Lomonosov museum -  a department of Peter the Great Museum of Anthropology and Ethnography in the building of Kunstkamera

Musicians

Classical 
Feodor Chaliapin Apartment and Museum - a branch of the St.Petersburg State Museum of Theatre and Music
Rimsky-Korsakov Apartment and Museum - a branch of the St.Petersburg State Museum of Theatre and Music

Rock 
John Lennon Love, Peace and Music Temple - at 10, Pushkinskaya street squat
Kamchatka -  of Viktor Tsoi

Actors 
The Samoilov Actors' Family Museum - a branch of the St.Petersburg State Museum of Theatre and Music

Politicians, statesmen's and military leaders' 
The State Museum of the Political History of Russia -  with several branches

Pre-1917 
Admiral Stepan Makarov's Memorial Study - at Gidropribor production facility in Saint Petersburg
Cabin of Peter the Great
Plekhanov House
Stroganov Palace
Suvorov Museum
Winter Palace of Peter the Great
Yusupov Palace on the Moika (Moika Palace)

Soviet politicians

Lenin museums 
Raznochinniy Petersburg (The St. Petersburg of Raznochintsy) 
The State Historical and Memorial Museum of Smolny - in the building occupied since the 1920s by the city government; previously of the former Smolny Institute next to Smolny Convent. In early 21st century it shows 1) the history of the pre-1917 institute (the first state educational facility for young ladies), 2) the history of 1917 October Revolution and the time the building was occupied until the spring of 1918 by the first Soviet Government led by Vladimir Lenin which later moved to Moscow, including Lenin's apartment/study, 3) later Soviet period.  The museum has branches, partly left after the closing in early 1990s of the city's branched subsidiary of National Lenin Museum:
the Yelizarov family memorial apartment near ulitsa Lenina (Lenin Street) in Petrogradsky district (one of Lenin's sisters Anna née Uliyanova was married to Mark Yelizarov, and Lenin was their guest); 
the Alliluyev family memorial apartment in 10th Sovietskaya ulitsa. (The family of Nadezhda Alliluyeva and her parents was frequented by Joseph Stalin after his Siberian exile).

Kirov museum 
Sergei Kirov Memorial Apartment Museum

Post-1988 public figures 
Anatoly Sobchak Museum of the Foundation of Democracy in Modern Russia

Fine arts museums and galleries 
Russian Museum
Benois Wing
Marble Palace
Mikhailovsky Castle
Mikhailovsky Palace
Stroganov Palace
Fabergé Museum
Erarta Museum and Galleries of Contemporary Art
 Museum of St. Petersburg Art, St. Petersburg, Russia 
Russian Academy of Arts Research Museum 
The State Hermitage Museum
General Staff Building's East Wing (pre-1917 ministerial quarters) 
Hermitage Theatre
Menshikov Palace
Military Gallery
Museum of Porcelain (Museum of the Imperial Porcelain Factory) 
New Hermitage
Old Hermitage
Storage Facility of the State Hermitage
Winter Palace of Peter the Great
Stieglitz Museum of Applied Arts

Local history museums 
Narva Triumphal Gate
Peter and Paul Fortress – home of The State Museum of the History of St. Peterburg
State Museum of the History of St. Petersburg

Science and natural history museums

Science museums 

Arctic and Antarctic Museum
Kunstkamera - originally, Chamber of Curiosities; officially, Peter the Great Museum of Anthropology and Ethnography
The Museum of Hygiene at the St. Petersburg City Center of Preventive Medicine  at Count Shuvalov Palace  
Museum of Military Medicine
Museum of Optical Technologies
Pulkovo Observatory - officially, the Main (Pulkovo) Astronomical Observatory of Russian Academy of Sciences
Umnikum -  a popular science museum for kids 
The Universe of Water

Natural history museums 
Arctic and Antarctic Museum
Kunstkamera
Saint Petersburg Botanical Garden of Komarov Botanical Institute
Zoological Collection of the Russian Academy of Science

Transport museums

Automobiles and motorcycles 
Horsepower Museum of vintage automobiles and motorcycles

Aviation museums 
Civil Aviation Museum of Civil Aviation Academy

Rail museums 
Central Museum of Railway Transport  
Museum of Electrical Transport - at otherwise nearly disused Vasileostrovsky tram depot
Oktyabrskaya Railway Museum - at disused Varshavsky Rail Terminal

Maritime museums 
Aleksandr Marinesko Museum of Russian Submarine Forces - at 83, Kondratiyeskiy prospekt 
С-189 diesel submarine, a Whiskey class submarine - moored off Lieutenant Shmidt Embankment, Vasilyevsky Island
Central Naval Museum
D-2 Narodovolets Submarine — at 10 Shkipersky Protok, Vasilyevsky Island; launched 1994; branch of Central Naval Museum
Krasin (1917 icebreaker)  
 Museum of Submarine Armaments and Admiral Stepan Makarov's Memorial Study at Gidropribor production facility in Saint Petersburg  
Old Saint Petersburg Stock Exchange and Rostral Columns - former territory of the city's commercial port with lighthouses, goods storage houses, stock exchange (the latter until 2012 housing the Central Naval Museum)
Russian battleship cruiser Aurora
Shtandart, a replica of an 18th-century yacht of tsar Peter the Great

Theatre, music and circus museums 
Alexandrinsky Theatre Endowment (Fund) Museum of Russian Drama (group visits only) 
"... and Muses never stopped" ("А музы не молчали") - a school museum dedicated to art and music in the besieged city during the World War II.
Circus Art Museum - at the working first Saint Petersburg  circus Ciniselli Circus
Gramophone and Samovar Museums - of clown Vladimir (private)  
St. Petersburg State Museum of Theatre and Music, with its branches:
Feodor Chaliapin Apartment and Museum
The Museum of Music and Music Instruments at the Count Sheremetev Palace
Rimsky-Korsakov Apartment and Museum
The Samoilov Actors' Family Museum

War and military museums 
First World War I museum - in Tsarskoe Selo; located in the recently restored Martial Chamber; features vehicles, military paraphernalia, documents, and even gas masks used for animals
General Staff Building (now belongs to Hermitage Museum)
Kazan Cathedral, St. Petersburg - now not a museum as such, but itself a monument to the victory in 1812 Napoleonic War, containing remains of the victorious Field Marshal Mikhail Kutuzov 
Military Gallery of the Winter Palace 
Museum of Military Medicine
Narva Triumphal Gate
Piskaryovskoye Memorial Cemetery - as well as St Seraphim of Sarov's Memorial Cemetery and a number of other memorial cemeteries
Saint Michael's Castle
Suvorov Museum

Museum parks and gardens 
Gatchina
Oranienbaum – now a branch of Peterhof museum
Pavlovsk, Saint Petersburg
Peterhof Palace – and many other museums and parks with fountains in Petergof
Saint Petersburg Botanical Garden
Summer Garden
Tsarskoye Selo in Pushkin, Saint Petersburg

Museums for children 
The Children's Center of Historical Education "Bolotnaya Street 13" - a branch of The State Museum of Political History 
Children's City Anichkov Palace Krestovskiy Island Bio-Eco Labs 
LabirintUm - a popular science museum for kids 
Leningrad Zoo
Saint Petersburg Dolls Museum
Saint Petersburg Toy Museum
Umnikum - a popular science museum for kids 
The Universe of Water

Philosophical museums 
Nicholas Roerich Museum-Institute  
Sigmund Freud Museum of Dreams

Religious museums and museum places of worship 
State Museum of the History of Religion

Christian

Russian Orthodox 
Kazan Cathedral, now not a museum as such, but formerly housing Museum of Religion and Atheism (presently occupying a different building, the State Museum of the History of Religion ); designed by Andrey Voronikhin, the cathedral resembles Vatican's St. Peter's Basilica and is a monument to Russia's victory in Napoleonic Wars of 1812-14   
Saint Isaac's Cathedral - designed by  Auguste de Montferrand; museum and its other branches ("The Ring of Cathedrals"):  
Church of the Savior on Blood - built to mark the place where the liberally reforming Tsar Alexander II of Russia was assassinated on March 1, 1881 by People's Will terrorists   
Saint Sampson the Hospitable's Cathedral - a 1730s monument to Russia's victory in the decisive Battle of Poltava in the Great Northern War over the Swedish Empire;the church grounds became the city's first interdenominational cemetery where many of St Petersburg's famous international architects were laid to rest, as well as the executed conspirators of the Volynski Plot    
Smolny Cathedral of Smolny Convent - features sky-blue Antonio Rastrelli's Baroque masterwork

Buddhist

Former museums 
Kazan Cathedral – now not a museum, but formerly housing Museum of Religion and Atheism

Food and drinks industry museums 
Beer Brewing Museum at Baltica Brewery 
Beer Brewing Museum at Stepan Razin Brewery  - now a member of the Heineken group 
Bread Museum 
Russian Vodka Museum

Private museums 
Horsepower Museum - vintage automobiles and motorcycles 
Gramophone and Samovar Museums - of clown Vladimir (private)

Suburban museums (royal country residences of palaces and parks) 
Gatchina
Oranienbaum, now a branch of Peterhof museum
Pavlovsk, Saint Petersburg
Peterhof Palace, many other museums and parks with fountains in Petergof
Tsarskoye Selo in Pushkin, Saint Petersburg

See also
List of buildings and structures in Saint Petersburg
List of museums in Moscow
List of museums in Russia

References

Museums
 List_of_museums
Saint_Petersburg
Saint_Petersburg
Saint_Petersburg